Argenta is a town and comune in the province of Ferrara, Emilia-Romagna.

Geography
Argenta is situated in a flat agricultural region near the Valli di Comacchio lagoon wetlands.  Much of the latter is today a wildlife sanctuary and Argenta is home of the Marsh Museum which offers many facilities for ornithology.

History
The town was founded by the Romans. In 1295 it was the seat of a convention of the main Ghibelline leaders of Romagna to decide the course of the war against the Papal forces.

In 1923 a Fascist squad murdered a Catholic priest, don Giovanni Minzoni, an anti-fascist and the voice of the poor farmers in Romagna, as well as a friend of several socialist politicians like Natale Galba.

During World War II the area was part of the German Gothic Line. In April 1945, in the Allied advance of Operation Roast, it was the location of the Battle of the Argenta Gap.

Twin towns
Argenta is twinned with:

  Castelnau-le-Lez, France, since 2003

Main sights
 Pieve di San Giorgio, a Palaeo-Christian church on the Reno River.
 Museum of the Valleys of Argenta
 Museo della Bonifica ("Museum of Land Reclamation")
 Duomo di San Nicolò
 San Domenico

Transportation
Argenta is located on the SS16 Adriatica state highway, which connects it to Ferrara and Ravenna. It has a station on the Ferrara-Ravenna-Rimini railroad.

References

External links
 The Marsh Museum
 Area map

Cities and towns in Emilia-Romagna